Kelsey  is an English surname and originated from an Old English place name in Lincolnshire, England. The place name derived from words meaning "Ceol's island" (Mills 1991). In modern times Kelsey has also become a given name for boys and girls in English-speaking countries. Kelsey comes from "island of the ships" in Irish and Scots, and "a dweller on the island, by the water" from Norwegian.

Kelsey may refer to:

Actors
 Edward Kelsey (1930–2019), English actor
 Greg Kelsey (1893-1967), stage name of British-born actor William Gregory Kelsall
 Ian Kelsey (born 1966), British television actor
 Linda Kelsey (born 1946), American television actress

Athletes
 Arthur Kelsey (1871–1955), English footballer
 Jack Kelsey (1929–1992), Welsh football goalkeeper
 Lloyd Kelsey (1897–1948), American tug-of-war competitor

Politicians and public servants
 Charles Kelsey (New York politician) (1821–1866), American politician
Edwin B. Kelsey, American politician, lawyer, and businessman
 Thomas Kelsey (died c. 1680), important figure in the government of Oliver Cromwell
 William H. Kelsey (1812–1879), U.S. Congressman (1855–1859)
 Tim Kelsey former National Director for Patients and Information in the National Health Service

Other
 Benjamin Kelsey (1813–1889), California pioneer, husband of Nancy Kelsey.
 Benjamin S. Kelsey (1906–1981), American Air Force test pilot and aeronautical engineer
 Carl Kelsey (1870–1953), American sociologist
 Frances Oldham Kelsey (1914–2015), naturalized American pharmacologist
 Henry Kelsey (c. 1667–1724), English fur trader, explorer, and sailor who played an important role in establishing the Hudson's Bay Company
 Hugh Kelsey (1926–1995), Scottish bridge player and writer
 John Kelsey (cryptanalyst), cryptographer currently working at NIST
 Nancy Kelsey, California pioneer, first white American woman to walk into California, called the Betsy Ross of California for sewing the Bear Flag

See also
 Kelsay (surname)
 Kelsie
Kelsay

References